Milton Tobías Oscar Alegre López (born 14 October 1991) is an Argentine-Chilean footballer who plays as a striker for Chilean club Santiago Wanderers since 2023.

Career
In November 2022, he joined Santiago Wanderers for the 2023 season.

Personal life
Alegre holds dual Argentine-Chilean citizenship since he received his naturalization certificate in August 2021.

References

External links
 
 
 

1991 births
Living people
People from Constitución Department
Argentine footballers
Argentine emigrants to Chile
Naturalized citizens of Chile
Chilean footballers
Association football forwards
O'Higgins F.C. footballers
Deportes Concepción (Chile) footballers
A.C. Barnechea footballers
Malleco Unido footballers
San Antonio Unido footballers
Deportes Melipilla footballers
General Velásquez footballers
C.D. Arturo Fernández Vial footballers
Deportes Colchagua footballers
Independiente de Cauquenes footballers
Deportes Recoleta footballers
Santiago Wanderers footballers
Chilean Primera División players
Primera B de Chile players
Segunda División Profesional de Chile players
Argentine expatriate footballers
Expatriate footballers in Chile
Argentine expatriate sportspeople in Chile
Sportspeople from Santa Fe Province